The Sri Lanka national cricket team toured England in the 1998 season. On the tour they played 4 first-class matches, 5 List A matches and a single Test match. They also competed in a tri-series tournament against England and South Africa, entitled the Emirates Triangular Tournament. They won the competition by defeating England in the final, also beating South Africa in the group stage. They won the only Test, with Muttiah Muralitharan taking a career best 16/220 – the 5th best bowling figures in a match in Test cricket history.

Tour matches

List A: Hampshire v Sri Lankans
The limited overs match against Hampshire, to be played at County Ground, Southampton on 12 July, was abandoned without a ball bowled. It did not have List A status.

First-class: Somerset v Sri Lankans

First-class: Glamorgan v Sri Lankans

First-class: Leicestershire v Sri Lankans

List A: Worcestershire v Sri Lankans

First-class: Middlesex v Sri Lankans

50-over: England Cricket Board XI v Sri Lankans

This match did not have List A status.

List A: Northamptonshire v Sri Lankans

List A: Northamptonshire v Sri Lankans

List A: Kent v Sri Lankans

The match's length was reduced after initial attempts to start a game had failed, due to problems with the pitch. Sanath Jayasuriya had been hit on the hand four times in the first four overs, and it was agreed that it was too hazardous to play on. Play resumed with 5 overs lost for each side.

First-class: Hampshire v Sri Lankans

Trailing by 308 runs and having lost their top order, the Sri Lankans decided to declare, with the hope of giving their openers and top order some batting practice. Despite being able to enforce the follow-on, Hampshire instead decided to forfeit their second innings, giving the Sri Lankans a target of 309 runs off the last 89 overs of the final day to win, which they reached following an unbeaten century from Chandika Hathurusingha and 90 from Mahela Jayawardene. Jayawardene went on to claim a place in Sri Lanka's Test squad to face England.

Emirates Triangular Tournament

Sri Lanka played in a tri-series tournament with South Africa and England. Played in a round-robin format, all three teams played each other once, with the top two teams going through to a head-to-head final to decide the winner.

Group stage

Table key
P = Games played
W = Games won
L = Games lost
NR = Games with no result
T = Games tied
NRR = Net run rate

Points system
Won = 2 points
Lost = 0 points
Tie or No result = 1 point
Standard net run rate rules applied.

Position deciders
The deciding factors, in order, on table position were:
Total points
Head-to-head result
Net run rate

Because England and Sri Lanka had the best run rates, they were ranked as the top two teams. England beat Sri Lanka and finished top of the group. South Africa's run rate meant they missed out on the final, despite having beaten England, and that a better run rate than Sri Lanka would have put them top of the table.

Final

Test series

Only Test

Records
Muttiah Muralitharan claimed what was, at the time, a career best 9/65 in the second innings – a record he has only bettered on one occasion, against Zimbabwe in 2002 – and was the 8th best bowling in a Test match innings at the time, but has slipped one place to 9th. The 16/220 claimed in the match is the 5th best bowling record in a match, a position it has stood in since the match.

John Crawley also claimed a Test career best of 156 not out. The match was the last England Test to be broadcast live by BBC Television in the UK, with Channel 4 and Sky screening the 1999 New Zealand tour of England.

See also
South African cricket team in England in 1998
1998 Emirates Triangular Tournament

Notes

External links
 CricketArchive
 Cricinfo
 Cricinfo: Test match averages

References
 Playfair Cricket Annual 1999
 Wisden Cricketers' Almanack 1999

1998 in cricket
1998 in English cricket
1998
International cricket competitions from 1997–98 to 2000